Stefanowo  is a village in the administrative district of Gmina Lesznowola, within Piaseczno County, Masovian Voivodeship, in east-central Poland.

The population is 500 people (2011).

In the years 1975–1998, the village belonged to the Warsaw province.

References

Stefanowo